The 1909–10 Tennessee Volunteers basketball team represents the University of Tennessee during the 1909–10 college men's basketball season. The Volunteers team captain was Solon S. Kipp.

Schedule

|-

References

Tennessee Volunteers basketball seasons
Tennessee
Tennessee Volunteers
Tennessee Volunteers